Pusiola elongata is a moth in the subfamily Arctiinae. It was described by Per Olof Christopher Aurivillius in 1910 and is found in Tanzania.

References

Arctiidae genus list at Butterflies and Moths of the World of the Natural History Museum

Endemic fauna of Tanzania
Moths described in 1910
Lithosiini
Moths of Africa